Through the Storm is the twelfth studio album by American heavy metal band Riot. It was released on August 26, 2002.

It is the only Riot album to feature drummer Bobby Rondinelli, best known for his work with Rainbow and Black Sabbath.

Track listing

Personnel

Band members
 Mike DiMeo - lead and backing vocals
 Mark Reale - electric and acoustic guitars, keyboards, string arrangements, producer
 Mike Flyntz - electric guitars, engineer
 Pete Perez - bass
 Bobby Rondinelli - drums

Additional musicians
Yoko Kayumi - violin, violin effects, keyboards
Josh Pincus - keyboards on "Only You Can Rock Me"
Tony Harnell - backing vocals

Production
Paul Orofino - producer, engineer, mixing, mastering
Chris Cubeta, Bruno Ravel, Bobby Jarzombek - engineers
Jeff Allen, Jack Bart - executive producers

References

2002 albums
Riot V albums
EMI Records albums
Metal Blade Records albums